Listed below are people killed by non-military law enforcement officers in Germany, whether in the line of duty or not, and regardless of reason or method. Also included are cases when people died in police custody due to applied techniques. Inclusion in the lists implies neither wrongdoing nor justification on the part of the person killed or the officer involved. The listing merely documents the occurrence of a death. The list below is not complete.

Statistics 

The numbers before 1978 can not be compared directly to the later numbers. A list of police killings was first compiled 1997, and the legal limit to keep records is 20 years, so some files may have been destroyed. The numbers do not include suicide.

Cases

1920s 
1920

1960s 
1962

1967

1970s 

1971

1972

1973

1974

1975

1977

1978

1979

1980s 
1980

1982

1983

1984

1985

1986

1989

1990s 
1990

1993

1994

1999

2000s 
2001

2002

2003

2004

2005

2006

2007

2008

2009

2010s 

2010

2011

2012

2013

2014

2015

2016

2017

2018

2019

2020s 

2020

2021

2022

See also 
 Lists of killings by law enforcement officers
 Use of firearms by police in Germany

References 

 List
Germany
Germany-related lists